Daniel Lee (born 16 January 1990) is a Sri Lankan swimmer. He competed at the 2008 Summer Olympics.

Career
Lee was five medals at the 2006 South Asian Games that were held in Colombo, Sri Lanka. Lee silver medals in the 50m and 100m freestyle events, and the 4x100 metre medley relay. Lee also won bronze in the 4x100 and 4x200 metre freestyle relays.

In June 2008, Lee was selected to represent Sri Lanka at the 2008 Summer Olympics. The following year, Lee was named as the assistant coach of the Monash University Swimming Academy in Australia.

References

External links
 

1990 births
Living people
Sri Lankan male swimmers
Olympic swimmers of Sri Lanka
Swimmers at the 2008 Summer Olympics
Swimmers at the 2006 Asian Games
Asian Games competitors for Sri Lanka
South Asian Games silver medalists for Sri Lanka
South Asian Games bronze medalists for Sri Lanka
South Asian Games medalists in swimming
20th-century Sri Lankan people
21st-century Sri Lankan people